Terak may refer to:
 Terak Corporation, a defunct American computer company based in Scottsdale, Arizona
 Terak 8510/a, the company's 1977 graphical workstation
 Terak Township, a township of Wuqia County in Xinjiang Uygur Autonomous Region, China
 King Terak, a minor Star Wars character